Anna Eleonora Brolin (born May 12, 1980, Adolf Fredrik's parish, Stockholm) is a Swedish sports reporter and sport-television presenter. Brolin has worked for VIASAT Sport and TV4. Brolin is the sister of the male model Carl Brolin, but is not related to the footballer Tomas Brolin. In the summer of 2010, she was selected for TV4's World Cup squad and reported on site from the World Cup in South Africa. Brolin participated as a contestant in Let's Dance 2013. She was present in Brazil as one of the presenters on TV4 during the 2014 FIFA World Cup. In 2016, she took over as host of Biggest Loser. In 2020, she was appointed program manager for the Farmen. She succeeded Paolo Roberto.

References

1980 births
Living people
Swedish television hosts
Swedish women television presenters
Journalists from Stockholm
21st-century Swedish journalists